The 2014 Grand National (officially known as the 2014 Crabbie's Grand National for sponsorship reasons) was the 167th annual running of the Grand National horse race at Aintree Racecourse near Liverpool, England. The showpiece steeplechase, which concluded a three-day meeting (one of only four held at Aintree throughout the year), took place on 5 April 2014. The maximum permitted field of 40 runners competed for a share of a record £1 million prize fund, which makes the National the most valuable jump race in Europe.

It was sponsored by Crabbie's for the first time, the ginger beer producer having taken over the sponsorship rights from John Smith's after the 2013 Grand National. The race was broadcast live on television by Channel 4 for the second time, having won the TV rights from the BBC after 2012, while the BBC retains the UK radio coverage rights it has held since 1927.

Pineau de Re, a 25/1 shot ridden by Leighton Aspell, won the race for trainer  Dr Richard Newland and owner John Provan, to become the sixth French-bred horse to win the Grand National. Eighteen runners completed the course, and all returned safely to the stables.

Race card

Entries for the Grand National had to be submitted by 28 January 2014. The following day, Aintree announced that 115 horses had been entered for consideration in the 2014 Grand National, an increase of 31 on the previous year and the highest number of initial entries since 2009. Handicap weights were announced by the British Horseracing Authority in London on 11 February.

There were scratchings' deadlines on 25 February and 18 March, after which 73 horses went forward to the five-day confirmation stage on 31 March. At that time they were reduced to 65 in total and the remaining contenders were ranked according to their ratings. On 3 April the final field of 40 runners was declared as follows: 

Great Britain unless stated.
Amateur jockeys denoted by preceding title, e.g. Mr.

Race overview

The race was due to go off at 4:15 pm on 5 April 2014 but a false start delayed the showpiece steeplechase. The starter Hugh Barclay got the field away at the second attempt, but Battle Group refused to race.

Twirling Magnet, Burton Port and Big Shu were fallers over the first three fences, before the Canal Turn claimed three further casualties. Another three fell at Valentine's, including the 12–1 shot Long Run. Teaforthree, who was sent off joint-favourite with Double Seven at 10/1, unseated his mount at The Chair.

Going onto the second circuit, 50/1 outsider Across the Bay held a strong lead until being all but carried out by the loose Tidal Bay before continuing almost tailed off. Shakalakaboomboom and Quito De La Roque were pulled up after the 20th and 21st fences respectively, then One in a Milan fell at Becher's Brook. Eighteen of the 39 runners made it over the final fence and on the long run-in to the finishing post Pineau de Re extended his lead over Balthazar King to win by five lengths. For Richard Johnson, aboard Balthazar King, this was his 18th attempt at the Grand National since his debut in the race in 1997, increasing an unwanted record for having taken most rides in the race without being victorious. A. P. McCoy finished third on Double Seven, and in doing so equalled Tom Olliver's 155-year record of having taken part in a record 19 Nationals. Alvarado was fourth and Rocky Creek came in fifth. Despite having been almost carried out, Across The Bay did complete the course, in 14th position.

The charity World Horse Welfare issued a statement after the race declaring that they were pleased with the positive effect the modifications of the course and strict guidelines laid down to riders had on the welfare of the horses; however, the stewards issued a 12-day riding ban to Jack Doyle, whom they judged should have pulled up when tailed off as his mount, Wayward Prince, appeared in an exhausted state before falling at the third-last fence. Jockeys had been told in their briefing before the race to pull up any horse that was tailed off with no serious chance of winning prize money, which is paid out to 10th place.

A stewards' inquiry was also called into the conduct of the jockeys at the start of the race, where it was claimed the welfare of assistant starter, Simon McNeill, who was knocked over but not injured, was compromised. While most of the 39 jockeys called to the inquiry initially attended, they all refused to return for a second inquiry after racing, issuing a statement in which they [the jockeys] had all agreed not to return to face the stewards as they were unhappy with the manner in which the inquiry was being conducted.

Finishing order

Non-finishers

Broadcasting and media

As the Grand National is accorded the status of an event of national interest in the United Kingdom and is listed on the Ofcom Code on Sports and Other Listed and Designated Events, it must be shown on free-to-air terrestrial television in the UK. The race was broadcast live on TV by Channel 4, entering the second of their four-year deal for the race. 

Clare Balding and Nick Luck presented Channel 4's coverage, supported by Jim McGrath, Mick Fitzgerald and Graham Cunningham. Reports were provided by Rishi Persad and Alice Plunkett and betting updates by Tanya Stevenson and Brian Gleeson. The commentary team was by Richard Hoiles, Ian Bartlett and Simon Holt, who called the winner home for the second time. After the race, Rishi Persad, Mick Fitzgerald and Richard Hoiles guided the viewers through a detailed re-run of the race. Channel 4 aimed its build-up to the race at the once-a-year punter rather than the dedicated racing fan with a special broadcast of its Sunday magazine show Sunday Brunch, as a Grand National Special Weekend Brunch, which included outside broadcast from Aintree.

Racing UK televised the race into bookmakers around the UK and Ireland. 

The BBC continued an unbroken run of 82 consecutive renewals of the race to be broadcast live on radio, dating back to 1927. The race was part of its Saturday Sport 5 Live broadcast, presented by Mark Pougatch with pre-race build-up from former National riders Andrew Thornton and Luke Harvey. Cornelius Lysaght interviewed connections in the ring and Rob Nothman provided market updates. The commentary team for the race itself was Malcolm Tomlinson, Darren Owen, Gary O'Brien and John Hunt, who called the finish.

The Grand National also continued to move rapidly into new media with the majority of betting on the race taking place with online bookmakers. In addition to this, broadcaster Channel 4 provided an online app that could be downloaded for backers to track their runner during the race.

See also
Horseracing in Great Britain
List of British National Hunt races

References

External links
2014 Grand National at Racing Post

2014
Grand National
Grand National
21st century in Merseyside
Grand
April 2014 sports events in the United Kingdom